"Songs About Rain" is a song written by Pat McLaughlin and Liz Rose and recorded by American country music artist Gary Allan. It was released in November 2003 as the second single from Allan's 2003 album See If I Care. The song peaked at number 12 on the U.S. Billboard Hot Country Singles & Tracks chart and at number 71 on the U.S. Billboard Hot 100 chart.

Content
In the song, the narrator describes how he is driving around in circles, having nothing to do but to think about the one who left him. He notes that he heard she has just married another man, and it has affected him more than he thought. The radio's continual playing of "songs about rain" is not helping the situation.

Critical reception
David Jeffries of Allmusic called the song "slow" and "epic" and stated that the song is further proof Allan is a "master balladeer". Michael Paoletta, of Billboard magazine also reviewed the song favorably saying that "Allan delivers an aching, poignant vocal that wrings every drop of emotion from the lyric." He also says that the writers should "get brownie points for reminding listeners of those great tunes."

Cultural references
As the title suggests, the song mentions the titles of several songs that talk about rain. Among the songs mentioned are "Rainy Night in Georgia," "Kentucky Rain," "Blue Eyes Crying in the Rain," "Early Morning Rain" and "Here Comes That Rainy Day Feeling Again."

Music video
The music video for the song was directed by Morgan Lawley, who directed Allan's three previous videos. It is a sequel to the "Man of Me" video, and was filmed in black-and-white in the Florida Everglades. Some shots in this video are a repetition of shots in that video, which brings the concept full circle. The same actress from "Man of Me" plays the woman in this video.

Chart performance
"Songs About Rain" debuted at number 51 on the U.S. Billboard Hot Country Singles & Tracks for the week of November 22, 2003.

Weekly charts

Year-end charts

Certifications

References

Songs about heartache
Songs about music
2003 singles
2003 songs
Gary Allan songs
Songs written by Liz Rose
Songs written by Pat McLaughlin
MCA Nashville Records singles
Song recordings produced by Mark Wright (record producer)

MCA Records singles